Integral University is a private university in Lucknow, the capital of Uttar Pradesh, India, It is located in the North-eastern part of the city in Dashauli, approximately 17Km from the center of the City. Integral University, the first enacted Minority University in the country, started functioning from 1 April 2004. U.G.C. accorded Integral University recognition under section 2(f) of the U.G.C. Act, 1956. The university was founded in 2004.

History

Founding
The foundation stone was laid on 3 November 1993 by Abul Hasan Ali Hasani Nadwi, rector of Darul-uloom Nadwatul Ulama at the Institute of Integral Technology, Lucknow. The main building was inaugurated by the then governor of Uttar Pradesh Motilal Vora on 14 January 1996. An engineering college was simultaneously established by the Islamic Council for Productive Education (ICPE) in 1997, which started functioning in 1998 with two courses; Computer Science Engineering, and Electronics Engineering. Later other courses like Architecture, Information Technology, Mechanical Engineering, Civil Engineering, and Master of Computer Application were added. Atal Bihari Vajpayee, the then prime minister of India, laid the foundation stone of a residential complex on 30 June 1999. During his speech, he expressed his hope that the Institute of Integral Technology, Lucknow having the abbreviation IIT will maintain the same standard as the other IITs do. The Institute is then affiliated to Uttar Pradesh Technical University.

Transformation into university
In recognition of the growth of the school, the Chief Minister of Uttar Pradesh, Mulayam Singh Yadav declared that the Institute of Integral Technology, Lucknow shall be elevated to a full-fledged university in no time.  He granted Minority Status to the institute. Soon after this declaration, he got the bill passed in the Assembly on 26 February 2004 and issued Govt. Gazette Notification No. 389/ lkr - fo -1-1 (d)-9-2004 dated 27 February 2004 for the formation of Integral University, Lucknow, under Act Number 9 of 2004 by the Uttar Pradesh state government. It is approved under Sections 2(F), 22(1) & 12(B) of UGC Act, 1956. It has been declared eligible to receive Central Assistance under Section 12(B) of the UGC Act, 1956. U.G.C. accorded Integral University recognition under section 2(f) of U.G.C. Act, 1956. The university started its journey for providing quality education in 2004. The existing faculties in the university were re-organized and new faculties of Science, Pharmacy, Education, Management Studies, Health & Medical Sciences, Agricultural Science & Technology, Humanities & Social Sciences, Computer Applications, Medical Sciences & Allied Health
Sciences, and Law were added.

Academics

Faculties
Integral University consists of 11 faculties:
 Faculty of Agriculture Science & Technology
 Faculty of Architecture, Planning & Design
 Faculty of Commerce & Management
 Faculty of Education
 Faculty of Engineering & IT
 Faculty of Health & Medical Sciences
 Faculty of Humanities & Social Sciences
 Faculty of Law
 Faculty of Pharmacy
 Faculty of Science
 Faculty of Nursing

Rankings

Integral University was ranked 46 in the pharmacy ranking in India by National Institutional Ranking Framework (NIRF) in 2020.

Integral University is also NAAC B+ Accredited Institution.

Facilities
The university is divided into blocks: Administrative block, Academic blocks 1, 2, and 3, Civil Block, Medical and Hospital Block, Library Block, and Architecture block. The university has four boys' hostels (1, 2, 3, 4), three girls' hostels, and a Resident Hostel for Doctors and Nurses. A Punjab National Bank branch is opened at the university. The university has seven computer centers and labs. There is a Mechanical workshop, with traditional and modern machines and the latest tools and instruments. The University also has a Robotics lab set up in August 2022. This Lab has various AI-controlled machines and research equipment for scholars and researchers.

References

External links
 

1998 establishments in Uttar Pradesh
Educational institutions established in 1998
Engineering colleges in Lucknow
Universities and colleges in Lucknow
Pharmacy colleges in Uttar Pradesh